Iván Macalik (born 14 September 1987) is an Argentine footballer who plays as a defender. He played in the Primera División for Lanús.

Career
Macalik began his playing career in 2005 with Ferro Carril Oeste of the Argentine 2nd division. In 2008, he was signed by Lanús but only made 4 first team appearances between 2008 and 2010. His only goal came in a 1-1 draw against Caracas F.C. in Copa Libertadores 2009.

References

External links
 Argentine Primera statistics  
 

1987 births
Living people
Sportspeople from Buenos Aires Province
Argentine footballers
Association football defenders
Ferro Carril Oeste footballers
Club Atlético Lanús footballers
San Martín de San Juan footballers
Argentine Primera División players
Argentine expatriate footballers
Expatriate footballers in Chile